The 1986 Lagan Valley by-election was one of the fifteen 1986 Northern Ireland by-elections held on 23 January 1986, to fill vacancies in the Parliament of the United Kingdom caused by the resignation in December 1985 of all sitting Unionist Members of Parliament (MPs). The MPs, from the Ulster Unionist Party, Democratic Unionist Party and Ulster Popular Unionist Party, did this to highlight their opposition to the Anglo-Irish Agreement. Each of their parties agreed not to contest seats previously held by the others, and each outgoing MP stood for re-election.

References

Other References
British Parliamentary By Elections: Campaign literature from the by-elections
CAIN: Westminster By-Elections (NI) - Thursday 23 January 1986
Northern Ireland Elections: Westminster by-elections 1986

Lagan Valley by-election
By-elections to the Parliament of the United Kingdom in County Antrim constituencies
By-elections to the Parliament of the United Kingdom in County Down constituencies
20th century in County Antrim
20th century in County Down